is a former Japanese football player.

Playing career
Shigeta was born in Isehara on July 15, 1976. He joined Verdy Kawasaki from youth team in 1995. He played several matches as right side back from 1997. In 1999, he moved to new club Yokohama FC in Japan Football League. he played many matches and the club won the champions for 2 years in a row (1999-2000). The club was promoted to J2 League from 2001 and he became a regular player. However his opportunity to play decreased from 2004 and retired end of 2005 season.

Club statistics

References

External links

1976 births
Living people
People from Isehara, Kanagawa
Association football people from Kanagawa Prefecture
Japanese footballers
J1 League players
J2 League players
Japan Football League players
Tokyo Verdy players
Yokohama FC players
Association football defenders